Robeco Schweiz is an international investment company with a specific focus on sustainability investments. It was founded in 1995 by Reto Ringger. The company is based in Zurich, Switzerland, and considers economic, environmental and social criteria in its investment strategies. In addition to asset management, the company has an indexes and private equity portion of the business. In 2006 RobecoSAM introduced a division called sustainability services that provides sustainability benchmarking reports to companies. In 2001, the then-RobecoSAM became the first carbon neutral company in Switzerland.

History

The company was founded by Reto Ringger in 1995 as the world's first investment company focused solely on sustainability themes. The headquarters are in Zurich, Switzerland and RobecoSAM has approximately 100 employees. Its sister company is the Dutch-based Robeco; both companies were subsidiaries of Rabobank until their sale to Orix.

Timeline
1995 Reto Ringger founds SAM

1999 SAM and Dow Jones launch the Dow Jones Sustainability Indexes

2001 First global sustainable water fund launched (SAM Sustainable Water
Fund)

2001 SAM becomes first carbon neutral company in Switzerland

2003 SAM Smart Energy Fund launched

2006 Acquired by Robeco

2009 Integration of SAM Clean Tech Private Equity at SAM's headquarters

2010 SAM named SRI/Sustainable Investment Manager of the Year  by Financial News

2010 Robeco Switzerland merges with SAM

2011 SAM Smart Energy Fund named Best Clean Energy Fund by Investment Week

2011 SAM manages SAM Sustainable Agribusiness Equities Fund and SAM Sustainable European Equities Fund

2012 SAM named Sustainable Investor of the Year by the Financial Times and the International Finance Corporation

2013 SAM becomes RobecoSAM

2020 RobecoSAM is renamed to Robeco Schweiz AG/Robeco Suisse SA/Robeco Switzerland Ltd.

Operations
The company's assets under management and advice amount to about US$11.5 billion (as of June 30, 2012).

The main areas of business are: asset management, indexes, private equity and sustainability services (company benchmarking reports).

In 1999, RobecoSAM and Dow Jones Indexes came together to produce the world's first family of sustainability indexes called the Dow Jones Sustainability Indexes (DJSI). In 2012, S&P Indices and Dow Jones Indexes merged to form S&P Dow Jones Indices. SAM now works with S&P Dow Jones Indices to produce the DJSI.

Companies are chosen for the index based on an assessment of their economic, environmental and social practices.

The Dow Jones Sustainability Index Family includes:
 Dow Jones Sustainability World Index
 Dow Jones Sustainability Europe Index
 Dow Jones Sustainability North America Index
 Dow Jones Sustainability Asia Pacific Index
 Dow Jones Sustainability Korea Index

Asset Management
The asset management business is based purely on investing in sustainable companies. Although SAM refers to it as Sustainability Investing, this is often referred to in the mainstream as Socially Responsible Investing (SRI). Sustainable investing is based on the assumption that financial markets represent a powerful mechanism to promote sustainable business practices. Proponents of sustainable investing say that integrating sustainability considerations into investment decisions can lead to superior risk-adjusted returns over the long term.

SAM has theme strategies based on major sustainability trends such as water, energy, materials, agribusiness, and climate. It also has core regional products such as a sustainable global active fund and a sustainable European equities fund. The SAM Sustainable Water Fund received a lot of recognition as it was one of the first of its kind to be launched in 2001. In 2011 it celebrated its 10th anniversary.

Clean Tech Private Equity
SAM houses the clean tech private equity team of its parent company Robeco, a member of Orix. The concept of clean tech investing is based on a world that is characterized by rapid population growth, finite natural resources, high prices and material shortages; all of which call for more efficient production processes. Investments include products, services, and processes across industry verticals that are designed to improve the productive and responsible use of natural resources, greatly reduce or eliminate environmental damage and provide superior performance at lower costs.

SAM Clean Tech Private Equity invests in sustainable private equity through co-investments in unlisted companies or through private equity fund of funds. Since 2004, they have been integrating the ESG framework into investment process. The United Nations Principles for Responsible Investment indicated that SAM Clean Tech Private Equity is a leader in integrating ESG into the investment process as well as into its ownership policies and practices. In 2010, Investment & Pensions Europe (IPE) named SAM Private Equity as the most Responsible European Private Equity Investor.

The table below demonstrates some examples of clean tech sectors and technologies:

Sustainability Services
In 2006, SAM founded a sustainability services division. Sustainability services provides company benchmarking reports that provide companies with details about their individual sustainability performance as well as a peer group comparison. Companies can see their strengths and weaknesses mapped against sustainability criterion and compared to best practice examples.

SAM Research
SAM's asset management, index and sustainability services are all rooted in its proprietary in-house research division. The financial analysts generate stock recommendations based on a combination of financial sustainability criteria.

The research team develops the methodology for the annual corporate sustainability assessment that is used to determine the Dow Jones Sustainability Index. SAM research has been analyzing companies along sustainability metrics since 1995 and has developed one of the largest global corporate sustainability databases. The research department often collaborates with academia to share the valuable data from this proprietary database. Ongoing collaborations include projects with ETH and IESE Business School.

Corporate sustainability assessment
The family of Dow Jones Sustainability Index are based on the results of the corporate sustainability assessment. The findings are then presented in the Industry Leader Report for each of the 60 industries assessed via the Corporate Sustainability Assessment and represented in the Dow Jones Sustainability Index.

Much of the data derived from the corporate sustainability assessment is used in SAM's financial analysis. The data is integrated into the valuation models. Full integration of sustainability into valuation analysis is a differing approach to using data as a sustainability overlay. Advocates of the integration approach state that it is a more accurate reflection of the companies value as it takes into account the various ways in which sustainability factors affect different business models and cost structures.

Also from the results of the corporate sustainability assessment, SAM produces a "Sustainability Yearbook" After the assessment, each participating company receives a peer benchmarking analysis. in which they announce the companies that have been ranked as sustainability "sector leaders" and/or "sector movers". They also give a small number of companies a classification of gold, silver or bronze to recognize their added commitment to sustainability issues. Sector leaders in the past have included: Adidas, BMW, Nokia, Panasonic, PepsiCo, Pirelli, and Rolls-Royce Group plc. Sector movers in the past have included: Air France, Fiat, Hormel, IBM, Mitsubishi, and Starbucks.

Awards
Best Climate Change Fund, 2010: The SAM Sustainable Climate Fund was awarded the "Best Climate Change Fund" by Investment Week
SRI/Sustainable Investment Manager of the Year Award, 2010: awarded by Financial News in October 2010.
TBLI Best Asset Manager Investing in ESG, 2008, 2009: awarded by IPE TBLI Group ESG Leaders Awards

Memberships
SAM is a member of the following organizations:
PRI, Principles for Responsible Investment
Eurosif, European Social Investment Forum
Ceres, Investors and Environmentalists for Sustainable Prosperity
ASrIA, The Association for Sustainable & Responsible Investment in Asia

Sustainability leadership awards
In 2001, SAM and Sustainable Performance Group (SPG) founded the sustainability leadership award. The award ran from 2001 to 2010 and was presented annually to a chosen sustainability leader and pioneer.

See also
 Dow Jones Sustainability Index
 Dow Jones Indexes
 World Water Index

References

Investment companies of Switzerland
1995 establishments in Switzerland